Betberg is a small village in Markgräflerland. It lies adjacent to Seefelden to the West. It is administratively a part of Buggingen, along with the village of Seefelden.

It is the home to the Haus der Besinnung, which is a retreat center run by the Protestant church in the village. The church is one of the oldest in the region.

Betberg is in the German state of Baden-Württemberg.

Towns in Baden-Württemberg